Venice Family Clinic is a community health center based in Venice, Los Angeles, California.

Launched in 1970 by volunteer physicians Philip Rossman, MD, founder, and Mayer B. Davidson, MD, co-founder, Venice Family Clinic first operated out of a borrowed storefront dental office after normal business hours. It is now the largest community health center on the Westside of Los Angeles with twelve sites in Venice, Santa Monica, Mar Vista, Culver City and Inglewood. The clinic served 25,817 patients in 114,633 visits in its fiscal year ending June 30, 2017.

Patients 
The clinic serves low-income, uninsured and homeless families and individuals. Its patients live primarily on the Westside of Los Angeles, but many come from across Los Angeles County.
 76% live below the federal poverty level 
 71% are minority group members
 28% are children 
 14% are homeless

Services 
Venice Family Clinic provides a wide range of services, from primary care, including medication, diagnosis, treatment, follow-up care, and laboratory services, to dental care, vision care, and mental health services, as well as specialty care provided by volunteer physicians in such areas as cardiology, dermatology, ear/nose/throat, endocrinology, neurology, gastroenterology, optometry, ophthalmology and podiatry. It also offers clinic-, shelter- and street-based outreach and care for people experiencing homelessness.

Awards 
Venice Family Clinic has received national accolades, including being recognized as a Federally Qualified Health Center (FQHC), Designated 330e, 330h and 330i Community Health Center, and Patient Centered Medical Home (NCQA Level 2 Recognition). The clinic has also been honored to receive the American Hospital Association's Foster G. McGaw Prize, The Pew Charitable Trust's Primary Care Achievement Award, American Psychiatric Association’s Advancing Minority Mental Health Award, and the California Health Care Foundation's LEAP (Leveraging Excellence, Advancing Practice) Award.

Venice Family Clinic's Art Walk & Auctions 
Venice Family Clinic produces the annual Venice Art Walk & Auctions fundraising event, which was started in 1979 with the help of artists who resided in Venice and were patients of the clinic. Venice Family Clinic's Art Walk & Auctions, known originally as the Venice Art Walk, grew substantially over the years due to Venice's global notoriety as a major art scene. In 2016, the event featured a tour of more than 50 artists' studios and a silent art auction of over 350 donated works. It is typically held on the third weekend in May.

References

External links 
 Official Venice Family Clinic Website
 Official Venice Art Walk & Auctions Website
 
 
Liz Forer - Executive Director, Venice Family Clinic KCET Departures Venice

1970 establishments in California
Healthcare in Los Angeles
Organizations established in 1970
Health centers
Clinics in California